Bosco Lowe (born March 27, 1943) is an American former stock car racing and ARCA driver who mainly competed in the NASCAR Busch Grand National Series, as well as its predecessors, the Sportsman Division, and the Late Model Sportsman Division.

Biography
Lowe mainly competed in the Busch Series, but he did compete in seven  Winston Cup Series races. His first race was the 1967 Hickory 100 at Hickory Speedway. It was in this race that he recorded his only career top-10. He gained some fame in the 1983 Daytona 500, when he spun his car on pit road and slid down along the pit wall. He competed in 133 Busch Series races and recorded 36 top-10 finishes. His best career finish was a second place in 1982. Lowe retired from driving in 1988. Lowe was also an accomplished ARCA driver from 1984 to 1985. During the 1985 season, he scored three top-5 finishes, six  top-10 finishes, and finished sixth overall. After racing, he ran Bosco Lowe Enterprises, an auto wrecking yard and sheet metal company.

References
https://web.archive.org/web/20131004132918/http://stockcar.racersreunion.com/photo/late-model-sportsman-series-legendary-driver-bosco-lowe-august?xg_source=activity

External links
 

1943 births
Living people
NASCAR drivers
ARCA Menards Series drivers